Football Club 72 Ierpeldeng or FC 72 Erpeldange is a football club, based in Erpeldange, in north-eastern Luxembourg. They play in the third tier Luxembourg 1. Division.

FC 72 Erpeldange play their home games at the Stade An Der Trell.

External links
FC 72 Erpeldange official website

Diekirch (canton)
Erpeldange
Erpeldange
1972 establishments in Luxembourg